Simon Belcher (born 18 December 1973) is a British racing driver, who last competed in the British Touring Car Championship for Handy Motorsport. He is also a multiple time British and European Jet Ski Champion who competes in the World Series

Career
Born in Swindon, Belcher began racing jet-skis at the age of nineteen, winning four British championships and a European championship before his retirement in 2001 he then switched to car racing, competing in Legends Cars over the next decade.  In 2011, he entered the Renault Clio Cup UK for the final race of the season with his own Handy Motorsport team ahead of full campaigns in 2012 and 2013. He finished 13th and 18th in the overall championships in these years, and won the Masters' Championship for older drivers on both occasions.

In 2014, Belcher moved up to the British Touring Car Championship, driving a Toyota Avensis run by the Speedworks team on behalf of Handy Motorsport.  He crashed heavily at Thruxton due to a mechanical failure, heavily damaging the car and putting the rest of his season in jeopardy, but it was repaired in time for the next round of the championship.

Racing record

Complete British Touring Car Championship results
(key) (Races in bold indicate pole position – 1 point awarded just in first race; races in italics indicate fastest lap – 1 point awarded all races; * signifies that driver lead race for at least one lap – 1 point given all races)

References

External links
Profile at btcc.net
Handy Motorsport official website

1973 births
Living people
British Touring Car Championship drivers
British racing drivers
Renault UK Clio Cup drivers